The Hälsinge Regiment, designations I 14, I 14/Fo 49 and I 14/Fo 21, was a Swedish Army infantry regiment that traced its origins back to the 16th century. It was disbanded in 1997. The regiment's soldiers were originally recruited from the provinces of Hälsingland and Gästrikland, and it was later garrisoned in Gästrikland.

History
The regiment has its origins in fänikor (companies) raised in Hälsingland and Gästrikland in the 1550s and 1560s. In 1615, these units—along with fänikor from the nearby provinces of Medelpad, Ångermanland and Västerbotten—were organised by Gustav II Adolf into Norrlands storregemente, of which eleven of the total 24 companies were recruited in Hälsingland and Gästrikland. Norrlands storregemente consisted of three field regiments, of which Hälsinge Regiment was one. Sometime around 1624, the grand regiment was permanently split into three smaller regiments, of which Hälsinge Regiment was one.

The regiment was officially raised in 1630 although it had existed since 1624. Hälsinge Regiment was one of the original 20 Swedish infantry regiments mentioned in the Swedish constitution of 1634. The regiment was also called Joakim Brahe's Regiment after its first commander Joakim Brahe. It was allotted in 1682 as the second Swedish regiment to be so, after Dalarna Regiment.

The regiment was given the designation I 14 (14th Infantry Regiment) in a general order in 1816. Hälsinge Regiment was garrisoned in Gävle from 1909. In 1973, the regiment gained the new designation I 14/Fo 49 as a consequence of a merge with the local defence area Fo 49. When the local defence area changed designation to Fo 21 in 1982, the designation changed to I 14/Fo 21. The regiment was disbanded in 1997, and the barracks that had been refurbished in 1995–1996 were turned into a college campus for the University College of Gävle.

Campaigns 

The Swedish War of Liberation (1521–1523)
The Northern Seven Years' War (1563–1570)
The War against Russia (1590–1595)
The Polish War (1600–1629)
The Thirty Years' War (1630–1648)
The Torstenson War (1643–1645)
The Northern Wars (1655–1661)
The Scanian War (1674–1679)
The Great Northern War (1700–1721)
The Hats' Russian War (1741–1743)
The Seven Years' War (1757–1762)
The Gustav III's Russian War (1788–1790)
The Finnish War (1808–1809)
The Campaign against Norway (1814)

Organisation 

1634(?)
Livkompaniet
Överstelöjtnantens kompani
Majorens kompani
Alfta kompani
Delsbo kompani
Ovansjö kompani
Arbrå kompani
Jervsö kompani

1814(?)
Livkompaniet
Forssa kompani
Järvsö kompani
Delsbo kompani
Färnebo kompani
Arbrå kompani
Alfta kompani
Ovansjö kompani

Heraldry and traditions

Colours, standards and guidons
The regiment have carried a number of colour over the years. In 1897, King Oscar II presented a new colour to the two battalions of the regiment, which then replaced the 1850 colour. On 29 September 1952, the 1897 colour was replaced when the regiment was presented with a new colour in Gävle by His Majesty the King Gustaf VI Adolf. It was used as regimental colour by I 14/Fo 21 until 1 January 1998. The new colour was similar to the 1850 colour. It was white and black, which is also the regimental colour, and taken from Hälsingland (black) and Gästrikland (white). The colour is drawn by Brita Grep. It has not been possible to discover who has manufactured the colour. It is embroidered by hand in insertion technique. Blazon: "On cloth per saltire black and white the provincial badge of Hälsingland; a rampant yellow buck, armed red. On a yellow border at the upper side of the colour, battle honours (Novgorod 1611, Warszawa 1656, Fredriksodde 1657, Tåget över Bält 1658, Lund 1676, Landskrona 1677, Narva 1700, Düna 1701, Jakobstadt 1704, Gemäuerthof 1705, Malatitze 1708, Gadebusch 1712) in black".

Coat of arms
The coat of the arms of the Hälsinge Regiment (I 14/Fo 21) 1977–1997 and the Gävleborg Group (Gävleborgsgruppen) since 1997. Blazon: The provincial badge of Hälsingland, saltire sable and argent, a buck rampant or, armed and langued gules. The shield surmounted two muskets in saltire or".

Medals
The medals from 1959 and 1982 are of the 8th size. In 1992, the medals were reinstated as a Jeton, but then of the 12th size. The medal ribbons are divided in black and white moiré.

Heritage
In connection with the disbandment of the regiment, its traditions came from 1 January 1998 onwards to be continued by Gävleborg Group. From 1 July 2013 the Gävleborg Battalion, within the Gävleborg Group.

Commanding officers
Regimental commanders active at the regiment during the years 1627–1997.

Commanders

1630–1360: Joachim Brahe
1630–1638: Åke Ulfsparre
1638–1645: Johan Oxenstierna
1645–1645: Johan Strijk
1645–1654: Gustaf Saabel
1654–1655: Gustaf Oxenstierna
1655–1660: Carl Larsson Sparre
1660–1669: Henrik Johan Taube
1670–1673: Anders Månsson Arenfeldt
1673–1683: Gustaf Karl von Wulffen
1683–1698: Ludvig Wilhelm Taube
1698–1700: Carl Gustaf Frölich
1700–1708: Jöran von Knorring
1708–1723: Gideon Fock
1710–1717: Reinhold Henrik Otto Horn
1717–1724: Lorentz von Nummers
1723–1738: Henrik Magnus von Buddenbrock
1739–1750: Johan Karl Silversparre
1750–1762: Reinhold Otto Fock
1762–1772: Anders Rudolf Du Rietz
1772–1776: Fredrik Gyllenswan
1776–1782: Arvid Nils Stenbock
1782–1809: Gustaf Wilhelm von Kaulbars
1809–1815: Fredrik Christian von Platen
1815–1847: Adolf Ludvig von Post
1847–1856: Charles Emil Rudbeck
1856–1860: Alexander Reuterskiöld
1860–1861: Sven Peter Bergman
1861–1864: Nils Henrik Hägerflycht
1864–1868: Axel Krister Gregersson Leijonhuvud
1868–1874: Ernst von Vegesack
1874–1882: Johan Gottlieb Wilhelm von Rehausen
1882–1893: Carl Bror Munck af Fulkila
1893–1901: Knut Robert Fabian Reuterskiöld
1901–1902: Johan Kasimir De la Gardie
1902–1909: Wilhelm Ernst von Krusenstjerna
1909–1915: Carl Alexander Fock
1915–1923: Georg Nyström
1923–1932: Henning Stålhane
1932–1933: Ernst Hortelius
1933–1934: Colonel Ernst af Klercker
1934–1940: Casper Ehrnborg
1941–1946: Carl Hamnström
1946–1955: Hans Berggren
1955–1957: Colonel Curt Göransson
1957–1967: Axel Henriksson
1967–1968: Colonel Nils Sköld
1968–1971: Jan Smedler
1968–1969: Carl-Henrik Gåsste (acting)
1971–1973: Carl-Henrik Gåsste
1973–1975: Allan Månsson
1975–1977: Colonel Robert Lugn (acting)
1975–1982: Senior colonel Carl-Henrik Gåsste
1982–1987: Ingmar Arnhall
1987–1991: Karl-Evert Englund
1991–1992: Folke Ekstedt
1993–1994: Senior colonel Hans Berndtson
1994–1994: Lars-Erik Ljungkvist (acting)
1994–1997: Tomas Bornestaf

Deputy commanders
1979–????: Colonel Paul Strömberg

Names, designations and locations

See also
List of Swedish infantry regiments

Footnotes

References

Notes

Print

Further reading

Infantry regiments of the Swedish Army
Disbanded units and formations of Sweden
Military units and formations established in 1630
Military units and formations disestablished in 1997
1630 establishments in Sweden
1997 disestablishments in Sweden